Love (stylized as LOVE) is the twelfth studio album of the Japanese boy band Arashi. The album was released on October 23, 2013 under their record label J Storm in two editions: a limited edition and a regular edition. The regular edition comes with a 32-page photo lyrics booklet, while the limited edition comes with a 60-page photo lyrics booklet and a bonus DVD with a music video for "P・A・R・A・D・O・X". The album sold over 670,000 copies in its first week and became the best-selling album of 2013 in Japan. It was released digitally on February 7, 2020.

Album information
Both the regular edition and the limited edition contain 16 songs. The regular edition comes with a 32-page photo lyrics booklet, while the limited edition comes with a 60-page photo lyrics booklet and a bonus DVD with a music video for "P・A・R・A・D・O・X". The album jacket cover for both versions are different.

Songs
"Love" includes two of the group's previously released singles: "Calling/Breathless" and "Endless Game". This album also includes eight new songs plus five of each member's solo songs.

The limited edition comes with a bonus music video for one of the new songs on the album, "P・A・R・A・D・O・X". The members of Arashi travelled to New York City to learn the choreography for this song, which was choreographed by JaQuel Knight. Arashi has not released a music video for an album song since 2011, when they released a video for "Mada Minu Sekai e" from the album Beautiful World.

Promotion
To support their new album, Arashi performed a live tour "Arashi LIVE TOUR Love" hitting all the major dome stadiums in Japan. They had 16 performances beginning on Nagoya Dome on November 8, followed by Sapporo Dome on November 15, Osaka Dome on November 22, Tokyo Dome on December 12, and Fukuoka Dome on December 20, 2013.

A video explaining the steps for the dance to their new song, "FUNKY", was uploaded onto their agency's official website. Arashi encouraged fans to learn the steps so that they could all dance together during the concert.

Track listing

Personnel
Credits adapted from liner notes.

Musicians

 Arashi
 Aiba Masaki – lead vocals
 Jun Matsumoto – lead vocals
 Kazunari Ninomiya – lead vocals
 Satoshi Ohno – lead vocals
 Sho Sakurai – lead vocals
 Kumi Sasaki – chorus arrangement , chorus 
 ko-saku – chorus arrangement 
 Shotaro – chorus arrangement 
 Akira – chorus arrangement 
 ha-j – chorus arrangement 
 Taeko Saito – chorus 
 Saeko Suzuki – chorus 
 Naoki Takao – chorus 
 Yoshito Fuchigami – chorus 
 Yutaka Odawara – drums 
 TARROW-ONE – drums 
 Toru Kawamura – drums 
 Chiharu Mikuzuki – bass guitar 
 SHIYOU a.k.a. Pit Bulldog – bass guitar 
 Takeshi Taneda – bass guitar 
 Yuzo Shibata – bass guitar 
 Hiroomi Shitara – electric guitar , acoustic guitar , electric mandolin , mandolin 
 Sho Horisaki – electric guitar 
 TAKU a.k.a. K-CITY PRINCE – electric guitar , programming 
 Horikazu Ogura – electric guitar , acoustic guitar 
 Genta Fukue – electric guitar 
 Akitoshi Kuroda – electric guitar , acoustic guitar , mandolin , ukelele 
 Gen ittetsu Strings – strings 
 the Gaya-xy – gaya 
 MITCH – trumpet 
 KenT – tenor saxophone 
 DJ O.H.B.A – turntable

Production

 Johnny H. Kitagawa – executive producer
 Julie K. – producer
 Jin Kano – musician co-ordinator
 Shigeru Tanida – recording, mixing
 Mikiro Yamda – recording
 Akitomu Takakuwa – recording
 Yohei Takita – recording
 Hideyuki Matsuhashi – recording
 Masahito Komori – recording
 Shohei Kojima – 2nd engineer
 Hiroaki Notoya – 2nd engineer
 Masayuki Tsuruta – 2nd engineer
 Ryota Hattanda – 2nd engineer
 Hiroshi Kawasaki – mastering
 Takayuki Nakazawa – art direction & design
 Hiroshi Manaka – photography
 Takafumi Kawasaki – wardrobe stylist
 MAKE-UP ROOM – hair & make-up
 Masato Kawai – props
 JaQuel Knight – choreographer

Release history

References

External links
 Love product information

2013 albums
Arashi albums
Japanese-language albums
J Storm albums